Venezuela competed at the 2004 Summer Olympics in Athens, Greece, from 13 to 29 August 2004. This was the nation's fifteenth consecutive appearance at the Olympics, since its debut in 1948. A total of 48 athletes, 33 men and 15 women, competed in 15 sports.

Venezuela left Athens with its first Olympic medal since 1984 and eighth overall in history. It was awarded to weightlifter Israel José Rubio, who earned the bronze in the men's 62 kg class.

Medalists

Athletics 

Venezuelan athletes have so far achieved qualifying standards in the following athletics events (up to a maximum of 3 athletes in each event at the 'A' Standard, and 1 at the 'B' Standard).

 Key
 Note – Ranks given for track events are within the athlete's heat only
 Q = Qualified for the next round
 q = Qualified for the next round as a fastest loser or, in field events, by position without achieving the qualifying target
 NR = National record
 N/A = Round not applicable for the event
 Bye = Athlete not required to compete in round

Men
Track & road events

Field events

Boxing 

Venezuela sent seven boxers to Athens.  Five of them lost their first matches, while the two in the heavier weight classes each won their first round (one by walkover, however) before falling in their second match.

Cycling

Road
Unai Etxebarría was the most notable Venezuelan cyclist at the 2004 Olympics, as he joined a leading group of 10 at the 146 kilometre mark of the men's road race, later attacked this group, leading to the formation of a group of 6 at the start of lap 13 (160 kilometres) before being caught by the peloton at the 185 kilometre mark, with Etxebarría finishing in the middle of the pack.

Track
Sprint

Diving

Venezuela has qualified a single diver.

Men

Fencing

Venezuela has qualified four fencers.

Men

Women

Judo

Venezuelan has qualified nine judoka (five men and four women).

Men

Women

Sailing

Venezuela has qualified a single boat in men's mistral.

Men

Shooting 

Women

Swimming 

Venezuelan swimmers earned qualifying standards in the following events (up to a maximum of 2 swimmers in each event at the A-standard time, and 1 at the B-standard time):

Men

Women

Table tennis

Taekwondo

Tennis

Venezuela has qualified a spot in the women's tennis.

Triathlon

Venezuela has qualified a single athlete in men's triathlon.

Weightlifting 

Venezuela has qualified three men in weightlifting.

Wrestling 

 Key
  – Victory by Fall.
  - Decision by Points - the loser with technical points.
  - Decision by Points - the loser without technical points.

Men's Greco-Roman

Women's freestyle

See also
 Venezuela at the 2003 Pan American Games
 Venezuela at the 2004 Summer Paralympics

References

External links
Official Report of the XXVIII Olympiad
Venezuelan Olympic Committee 

Nations at the 2004 Summer Olympics
2004
Summer Olympics